Yass Valley Council is a local government area in the Southern Tablelands region of New South Wales, Australia. The area is located adjacent to the Hume and Barton Highways and the Main Southern railway line.

The Shire includes the towns, and extensive rural and residential areas of: 

It also includes the localities of:

The Yass Shire was proclaimed on 1 January 1980 following the amalgamation of Goodradigbee Shire and the Municipality of Yass. Yass Shire in turn was dissolved and merged into the Yass Valley Council on 11 February 2004, following a further amalgamation of Yass Shire and parts of Gunning and Yarrowlumla Shires.

The mayor of Yass Valley Council is Cr. Allan McGrath.

Demographics

There were 400 people (2.5%) who identified as being of Indigenous origin in the 2016 census. The median age was 42 years.

82.8% of the population was born in Australia. 3.6% were born in England, 1.2% in New Zealand and 0.4% in each of Germany, the United States and Netherlands. English was stated as the only language spoken at home by 14,550 people (90.2%). The three most common languages spoken at home other than English were Croatian (0.4%), German (0.4%) and Dutch (0.2%). 84.3% of households had at least one resident who accessed the internet by any type of electronic device.

The median weekly individual income for people aged 15 years and over at the 2016 census was $869 (Australian average: $662). The median weekly family was $2,214 (Australian average: $1,734) and the median household family was $1,879 (Australian average: $1,438).

In the 2016 census, there were 5,185 separate houses (94.0%), 216 semi detached, row or terrace houses and townhouses (3.9%), 27 flats, units or apartments (0.5%) and 37 other dwellings (0.7%). Of all occupied private dwellings, 4,343 were either fully owned or being purchased, which represents (78.6%) of all occupied private dwellings, while 1,011 (18.3%) were being rented.

Council

Current composition and election method
Yass Valley Council is composed of nine Councillors elected proportionally as one entire ward. All Councillors are elected for a fixed four-year term of office. The mayor is elected by the councillors at the first meeting of the council. The most recent election was held on 4 December 2021, and the makeup of the council is as follows:

The current Council, elected in 2016, in order of election, is:

Transport facilities
Yass Valley is serviced by the following transport facilities:

 Hume Highway (National Highway 31)
 Barton Highway (National Highway 25)
 Lachlan Valley Way (State Route 81)
 Main Southern Railway (NSW TrainLink)
 Transborder Express (A local bus & coach firm)

References

 
Local government areas of New South Wales